Richard Alan Causey born  is one of the prominent figures in the Enron accounting scandal. Causey was Enron's executive vice president and chief accounting officer.

Causey graduated from the University of Texas at Austin with a bachelor's degree in accounting and an MBA. He then became a certified public accountant in the state of Texas. He obtained a job at Arthur Andersen, where he rose within the ranks and eventually became the head of the Enron audit team.

Closely working alongside employees from Enron, he got to know the staff as well as the accounting procedures. He left Arthur Andersen and joined the Enron Capital and Trade Division. He eventually was promoted to chief accounting officer, where he signed off on the Special Purpose Entities that were Enron's downfall. He was fired from Enron on February 14, 2002, as part of an investigation by the U.S. Securities and Exchange Commission.

On January 22, 2004, Causey was indicted for wire fraud and conspiracy charges in connection with his activities at Enron between 1998 and 2002. While prosecutors do not believe he skimmed millions of dollars from the numerous suspicious deals, he is believed to know details of many of them. Causey originally pleaded not guilty, but on December 28, 2005, he entered a guilty plea and agreed to testify against Kenneth Lay and Jeffrey Skilling in exchange for a 5- to 7-year prison term.  Skilling's lawyer Daniel Petrocelli reportedly responded that Causey was innocent, and simply broke under the pressure. On January 2, 2007, Causey reported to the Federal Correctional Institution in Bastrop, Texas. He was released on October 14, 2011.

References

External links
 Indictment filed against Richard Causey
 Richard Causey's campaign contributions

Living people
1960 births
American accountants
American energy industry executives
Enron people
Businesspeople from Austin, Texas
Place of birth missing (living people)
McCombs School of Business alumni
American people convicted of fraud
Businesspeople from Houston
American business executives
American businesspeople convicted of crimes